Andimadam block is a revenue block of Ariyalur district of the Indian state of Tamil Nadu. This revenue block consists of 30 panchayat villages.

They are,

References 

Revenue blocks of Ariyalur district